Michel Therrien (born November 4, 1963) is a Canadian professional ice hockey coach. (NHL). Therrien formerly coached the Montreal Canadiens, the  Pittsburgh Penguins and the Philadelphia Flyers.

Prior to his coaching career, Therrien played professionally for three years as a defenceman in the American Hockey League (AHL), compiling a total of 86 points in 206 games and winning the Calder Cup in 1985 with the Sherbrooke Canadiens, on the same team as eventual Hockey Hall of Famer Patrick Roy. When his playing career ended, Therrien worked for a time as a lineman for Bell Canada, with a sideline as a bodyguard for Quebec singing star Roch Voisine, with whom he had once played hockey, while working his way into a coaching career.

Before coaching in the professional leagues, Therrien was a coach in the Quebec Major Junior Hockey League (QMJHL), first as an assistant with the Laval Titan and later as head coach for the Granby Prédateurs, with whom the club won the Memorial Cup in 1996, ending a 25-year championship drought in the tournament for a team from Quebec. He is a single parent of two children, Elizabeth and Charles.

Coaching career

Montreal Canadiens
In 2000, after stumbling out to a 5–13–2 record, the Montreal Canadiens fired Head Coach Alain Vigneault and hired rookie Michel Therrien. The Canadiens went 23–27–6–6 under Therrien and missed the 2001 Stanley Cup playoffs.

In his first full season as the Canadiens head coach, Michel led the Habs to an impressive record of 36–31–15, a 16-point improvement from the previous year. In the 2002 playoffs, Therrien's Canadiens upset the top-seeded Boston Bruins in six games before losing to the Carolina Hurricanes.

Pittsburgh Penguins
For two-and-a-half seasons, Therrien was the head coach of the American Hockey League (AHL)'s Wilkes-Barre/Scranton Penguins. He led the Penguins to the Calder Cup playoffs in 2004 and 2005.

After leading Wilkes-Barre/Scranton to a franchise-record start (21–1–2–1) in the 2005–06 season, Therrien was promoted by Pittsburgh on December 15, 2005, as a mid-season replacement for Ed Olczyk. The Pens, however, did not turn their season around, going 14–29–8 under Therrien. The Penguins started the 2006–07 season in mediocre fashion. However, they picked up play in January, going 14–0–2 on one stretch. The streak led the Penguins to a 47–24–11 record and a fifth-place berth in the 2007 playoffs. The Pens, however, fell in five games to the Ottawa Senators.

During the 2006–07 season, Therrien coached the Penguins to one of the most successful single-season improvements in NHL history, finishing with a 47–24–11 record (105 points), a berth in the 2007 playoffs and a nomination for the Jack Adams Award as the NHL's Coach of the Year.

Despite a slow start the next season, in 2007–08, the Pens began to turn things around in November 2007. They would go on to win the 2008 Winter Classic and later clinch the Atlantic Division with a 4–2 win against their state-rivals, the Philadelphia Flyers. In the first round of the 2008 playoffs, the Pens avenged their 2007 playoff series loss by downing the Ottawa Senators in a four-game sweep. They then defeated the New York Rangers and the Philadelphia Flyers each in five games to win the 2008 Eastern Conference Championship and the Prince of Wales Trophy. The Pens eventually lost in the 2008 Stanley Cup Finals to the Detroit Red Wings in six games, finishing the playoffs with a 14–6 record. On July 18, 2008, Therrien signed a contract extension with the Penguins through to the 2010–11 NHL season.

The next season, the Penguins shot out to one of the best starts in franchise history, only to slow down considerably heading into December. The slide continued, and on February 15, 2009, a day after a 6–2 loss to the Toronto Maple Leafs and with the Penguins struggling to stay in the playoff race, Therrien was relieved of his duties as head coach of the Penguins. Therrien finished two games behind Red Kelly for the second-longest tenure as Penguins' head coach. Dan Bylsma took over as Therrien's replacement. After his termination, he continued to reside in Pittsburgh and followed the team as they advanced to the 2009 Stanley Cup Finals and won the Stanley Cup in Game 7 in Detroit.

Return to Montreal
On June 5, 2012, Montreal Canadiens executive vice president and general manager Marc Bergevin announced the appointment of Michel Therrien as the club’s new head coach. His first season was a successful one, leading the Habs to first in the Northeast Division after the team had finished last in the previous season. However, the team ended up losing in the first round to the Ottawa Senators in five games. In his second season, 2013–14, he led the Habs to the Eastern Conference Finals, though the team lost to the New York Rangers in six games. At the end of the season, general manager Marc Bergevin rewarded Therrien with a new contract, a four-year extension. With the contract, he became the highest-paid coach in the history of the Canadiens. In 2015–16, after starting the season with a 19–4–3 win–loss record, the Canadiens collapsed following an injury to goaltender Carey Price, ending the season with a .500 record and failing to make the playoffs. On November 4, 2016, his 53rd birthday, the Canadiens got blown out 10-0 by the Columbus Blue Jackets. On January 7, 2017, Therrien recorded his 400th win as a coach in a 5–3 victory over the Toronto Maple Leafs. However, on February 14, 2017, he was once again fired by the Canadiens and replaced as head coach by Claude Julien for the second time. At the time of his firing, the Canadiens were ranked first in the Atlantic Division with a 31–19–8 record. Their season started with a strong 13-1-1 start, but followed with a disappointing run of 18-18-7 which led to his firing.

Philadelphia Flyers
On May 5, 2019, Michel Therrien returned to the NHL as an assistant coach to Alain Vigneault of the Philadelphia Flyers.  On December 6, 2021, Therrien was relieved of his duties.

Coaching record
Note: Brackets around points (Pts) indicate a partial season of coaching.

References

External links

1963 births
Living people
Baltimore Skipjacks players
Canadian ice hockey coaches
Canadian ice hockey defencemen
Chicoutimi Saguenéens (QMJHL) players
French Quebecers
Granby Prédateurs coaches
Ice hockey people from Montreal
Laval Titan coaches
Longueuil Chevaliers players
Milwaukee Admirals (IHL) players
Montreal Canadiens coaches
Nova Scotia Voyageurs players
Philadelphia Flyers coaches
Pittsburgh Penguins coaches
Quebec Remparts players
Sherbrooke Canadiens players
Wilkes-Barre/Scranton Penguins head coaches